The surname Schrank is an occupational surname of Germanic descent (old high German: scranc). The word Schrank loosely translates to "cabinet" (e.g. Kühlschrank, compound word meaning "cold-cabinet", i.e. refrigerator) or "closet" (e.g. Wäscheschrank or linen-closet). Schränk also translates to "saw". The name "Schrank" may refer to
 Franz von Paula Schrank (1747–1835), German botanist and entomologist
 John F. Schrank (1876–1943), failed American assassin
 Peter Schrank (born 1952), cartoonist

Other uses:
 Schrank (shortened form of kleiderschrank), a tall wardrobe-like German chest with double doors. Often used as hope chests, these were constructed so as to partially dismantle for transport to the matrimonial home.